Kaniv is a city located in Cherkasy Raion, Cherkasy Oblast (province) in central Ukraine. The city rests on the Dnieper River, and is also one of the main inland river ports on the Dnieper. It hosts the administration of Kaniv urban hromada, one of the hromadas of Ukraine. Population: 

Kaniv is a historical town that was founded in the 11th century by Kievan Prince Yaroslav the Wise. This pleasant city is known today mostly for the burial site of Taras Shevchenko, the great Ukrainian poet and artist.

Picturesque and ancient, Kaniv was once one of the largest cities of Kievan Rus'. At that time, it was an outpost used for diplomatic meetings between Ruthenian princes and ambassadors of militant tribes. Later, in the 18th century, it became a popular destination for elderly Cossacks, who wanted to live out their days on the banks of the great Dnieper River, and on the Chernecha Mountain, where, according to legend, a monastery stood in the past. The mountain remains one of Kaniv's most important places, attracting thousands of tourists to the city. Today it is most famous as a burial place of the celebrated Ukrainian poet and painter Taras Shevchenko, who is considered a founder of modern Ukrainian literature, which is located on Taras Hill overlooking the Dnieper. The Kaniv reserve is the oldest historical and cultural reserve in Ukraine. Spring is the best time to visit the Tarasova Hill. At this time, the territory is well-groomed and full of flowers.

Industry in the city includes Kaniv hydroelectric power plant located on the Kaniv Reservoir on the Dnieper, fruit and vegetable, condiments factory, large milk and cheese factory, poultry processing.

History

The city's date of establishment is unknown. It was first mentioned in the Paterikon of Caves Monastery in Kyiv of the 11th century where it is mentioned about relocation of icon painters from Constantinople during rule of Vsevolod of Kyiv. The first mentioning of Kaniv in chronicles is dated 9 June 1144 when the Grand Prince of Kyiv Vsevolod II founded here the Church of St.George (Dormition Cathedral). In chronicles it is also mentioned that in 1149 the Grand Prince of Kyiv George the Long-Armed after conquering Kyiv appointed his son Gleb as a prince in Kaniv. The city was also mentioned later in chronicles often in relation to raids onto Cumans. Among the killed Ruthenian princes at the 1223 battle at Kalka River, there was mentioned Prince Svyatoslav of Kaniv.

Archaeological excavations indicated that earlier Slavic settlement already existed near Kaniv before the 10th century. Also, some documents indicate the existence of the Holy Dormition Kaniv monastery in the 11th century.

There is no definite information on the source and meaning of the city's name; supposedly its name is derived from the personal nickname Kanya ('buzzard'). M.P.Yanko in his Toponymic dictionary of Ukraine says that the name is derived from Turkish word meaning the place of khan. There are also number of other hypotheses on the city's name.

From mid 12th century Kaniv became a big city and played prominent role in the Kievan Rus' (Ruthenian state) where it was a center of an apanage principality within the principality of Kyiv. Until the 13th century, the central part of Kaniv was so called "Hellenic town" located at the Moskovka Mountain.

According to popular historic sources, in 1239 the city was conquered and razed by the Mongols.

Kaniv has been mentioned in report of Giovanni da Pian del Carpine after his 1245 travel to the Mongol Empire. In the report the city is mentioned as a Tatars post.

In the Middle Ages it was located on the Road from Varangians to Greeks. Initially part of Kievan Rus', in the 1362 it was annexed by the Grand Duchy of Lithuania. In 14th century Grand Prince of Lithuania Vitautas built in Kaniv a castle that existed until 1768.

In 1431, it became part of the Lithuanian Kyiv Voivodeship. It was sacked by the Ottoman Turks in 1458. In 1569, Kaniv came under the rule of Poland, and it was also one of the centers of Cossack culture and military life. In 1600, it received the Magdeburg Rights, but the city's prosperity was halted by successive plagues, fires, and Cossack unrest. Kaniów was a royal city of the Lesser Poland Province of the Polish Crown. During The Deluge the town was captured by the forces of Bohdan Khmelnytsky in 1648.

In 1648-78 the city was center of the Kaniv regiment, Cossack formation of which was established long before the Khmelnytsky Uprising as part of the Polish registered Cossacks formations. In 1662, the Right-Bank forces of Yuri Khmelnytsky, supported by Polish and Crimean Tatar troops, were defeated in the battle of Kaniv by the Russian forces of Grigory Romodanovsky and the Left-Bank Cossacks of Yakym Somko. In 1678 the Kaniv regiment was overran by Turks and its administration was transferred to Bohuslav. In 1768, it was captured by one of the leaders of the Koliyivschyna, Maksym Zalizniak. As an effect of a pogrom, most of the local szlachta and Jews were killed.

In 1775 Kaniv became a personal property of the King of Poland Stanisław August Poniatowski who in 1777 gave it away to his nephew S.Poniatowski. In 1787, Kaniv was visited by Catherine II. She met there with Polish king Stanisław August Poniatowski.

Following the Second Partition of Poland in 1793 the town with large parts of other territories came under the control of the Russian Empire. In 1800 Poniatowski sold bigger portion of the city to archimandrite of the Kaniv Monastery of Saint Basil the Great B.Fizikiewicz who in his turn bequeathed his property to the local school of the Order of Saint Basil the Great.

During the later stages of the Great War, on May 11, 1918, the town was the seat of the Battle of Kaniów, in which the forces of the 2nd Polish Corps and the Polish Legions under Józef Haller de Hallenburg failed to break through the Austro-German lines to the Russian side. During the Second World War, Kaniv was a site of a tragically unsuccessful drop of Soviet paratroopers. 
 
In 1978, Oleksa Hirnyk burned himself to death, on a hill near Shevchenko's tomb in protest of Russification.  In 2007, he was honored as a Hero of Ukraine.

Rebuilt in 1966–70, since 1972 the Dormition Cathedral building was housing the newly established Kaniv folk art museum. After dissolution of the Soviet Union, the church was passed to the Easter Orthodox community of Moscow Patriarchate, while the museum was relocated to another former religious building that used to belong to the Ukrainian Order of Saint Basil the Great.

Until 18 July 2020, Kaniv was designated as a city of oblast significance and did not belong to Kaniv Raion even though it was the center of the raion. As part of the administrative reform of Ukraine, which reduced the number of raions of Cherkasy Oblast to four, the city was merged into Cherkasy Raion.

Administrative status

Kaniv is the administrative center of the Kaniv Raion (district). However, the city is a city of oblast subordinance, thus being subject directly to the oblast authorities rather to the raion administration housed within the city itself.

Landmarks and monuments 
 Taras Hill — burial site of Ukrainian poet and artist Taras Shevchenko
 Grave and museum of Taras Shevchenko
 Monument to Oleg Koshevoy, a hero of the Soviet Union
 Museum of Arkady Gaidar 
 Kaniv Hydroelectric Power Plant (HPS)
 Second World War Memorial Park;
 Monument to St. Makariy of Kaniv;
 Alley of Glory (Park Slavy);

International relations

Twin towns — Sister cities
Kaniv is twinned with:

See also 

 List of cities in Ukraine

Gallery

References 
Notes

Bibliography
 (1972) Історіа міст і сіл Української CCP - Черкаська область (History of Towns and Villages of the Ukrainian SSR - Cherkasy Oblast), Kyiv. 
 Korsun-Shevchenkivskyi in the Encyclopedia of Ukraine

External links
 Volodymyr Kubijovyč, Kaniv in the Encyclopedia of Ukraine
 JewUa.org - History of Jewish community in Kaniv

 
Cities in Cherkasy Oblast
Kanevsky Uyezd
Cossack Hetmanate
Cities of regional significance in Ukraine
Populated places on the Dnieper in Ukraine